Renji (廉侍) is a masculine Japanese given name name.

Possible writings
Renji can be written in Hiragana as レンジ. In Kanji, it can be alternatively rendered as;

廉侍 "a pure heart, samurai."
蓮司 "lotus, preside over."
蓮治 "lotus, govern."
蓮慈 "lotus, be affectionate."
廉二 "a pure heart, two."
廉司 "a pure heart, preside over."
恋司 "love, preside over."
廉士 "a pure heart, samurai."
廉慈 "a pure heart, be affectionate."
廉次 "a pure heart, next."
廉治 "a pure heart, govern."
廉示 "a pure heart, shows."
怜仁 "clever, benevolence."
恋士 "love, samurai."
恋次 "love, next."
恋治 "love, govern."
漣二 "ripple, two."
漣司 "ripple, preside over."
漣璽 "ripple, emperor's seal."
練時 "practice, time."
蓮二 "lotus, two."
蓮侍 "lotus, samurai."
蓮史 "lotus, history."
蓮地 "lotus, ground."　
蓮士 "lotus, samurai."　
蓮弐 "lotus, two."　
蓮志 "lotus, aspire."　
蓮次 "lotus, next."　
連路 "communicating, a road."

People with the name
Renji Matsui (松井 蓮之, born 27 February 2000) a Japanese soccer player.
Renji Ishibashi (石橋 蓮司, born Renji Ishida (石田 蓮司, Ishida Renji, born August 9, 1941) is a Japanese actor.
Renji Panicker (born 23 September 1960) is an Indian actor.

Places
Renji may refer to:

 Renji Hospital, Shanghai, China
 Yan Chai Hospital, Renji in pinyin, Hong Kong
 Gibb, Livingston & Co., known as Renji in Chinese

Fictional characters
 Renji Abarai, a fictional character in the anime and manga series Bleach

 Renji Kamiyama, a fictional character in the Yakuza video game series.

 Renji Yomo, a fictional character in the anime and manga series Tokyo Ghoul

 Renji Yanagi, a fictional character in the anime and manga series The Prince of Tennis

Japanese masculine given names